1980
Soviet
Films